Kenneth George Wiesner (February 17, 1925 – March 20, 2019) was an American high jumper who won a silver medal at the 1952 Olympics. Wiesner attended Marquette University, where he was a three-time NCAA high jump champion. After the 1946 season he retired and became a dentist at U.S. Navy. He returned to compete at the 1952 Olympics, and in 1953 broke the world indoor record three times.

References

1925 births
2019 deaths
American male high jumpers
Marquette University alumni
Olympic silver medalists for the United States in track and field
Athletes (track and field) at the 1952 Summer Olympics
Medalists at the 1952 Summer Olympics